Judith A. Snider (born January 26, 1948) is a judge retired from the Federal Court of Canada.  She retired from the court October 15, 2013 and currently is an international mediator and arbitrator.

Background

Her undergraduate education was at Carleton University and she is a graduate of the University of Calgary Law School in 1981.  She was a partner at the law firm of Code Hunter from 1987 to 1992 and became General Counsel for the National Energy Board for the years 1992 to 1995 as a member from 1995 to 2002, and as Vice-Chairman from 1999 to 2002.

References

1948 births
Living people
Canadian women judges
Judges of the Federal Court of Canada
People from Toronto